Mrkonje is a village in the municipality of Medveđa, Serbia. According to the 2002 census, the village has a population of 44 people.

References

Populated places in Jablanica District